Super R.B.I. Baseball is a baseball video game developed by Gray Matter and published by  Time Warner Interactive. It was released for the Super Nintendo Entertainment System in 1995 exclusively in North America.

The game is officially licensed by the Major League Baseball Players Association, offering 700 actual baseball players from the 1994 Major League Baseball season in addition to 28 unlicensed teams. There are six modes to play: exhibition, Home Run Derby, defense practice, playoffs, league (in which teams play every other team in succession just like in NBA Jam), and Game Breaker (which allows players to change the course of Major League Baseball history).

The realistic-styled stadiums are contrasted with the cartoon-like graphics. However, the stadiums are altered from their MLB counterparts due to copyright issues. Jack Buck provides a play-by-play analysis of the action.

Reception
The video game review magazines of the mid-1990s gave this game mixed reviews. GamePro highly praised the game's selection of options and stats and the clearly detailed, comical graphics. However, they described the controls as poor, with both a confusing configuration and slow reactions to button presses. They concluded: "With more features than any other baseball cart, Super RBI should've been serious competition for excellent games like World Series Baseball. Too bad the controls undercut that potential".

References

1995 video games
Major League Baseball video games
North America-exclusive video games
Super Nintendo Entertainment System games
Super Nintendo Entertainment System-only games
Top-down video games
Multiplayer and single-player video games
Video games developed in Canada
Video games scored by Andy Armer